is a former Japanese football player.

Playing career
Kobara was born in Yokohama on November 2, 1982. He joined the J1 League club Yokohama F. Marinos youth team in 2001. Although he played several matches as center back during the first season, he did not play much in the club that had Japan national team players Naoki Matsuda, Yasuhiro Hato, and Yuji Nakazawa. In 2004, he moved to the J2 League club Vegalta Sendai and played often. In 2005, he moved to the J2 club Montedio Yamagata. He became a regular player and played often as center back with Leonardo Henriques da Silva. However his opportunity to play decreased, as opposed to newcomer Hidenori Ishii, starting in 2008. Although the club was promoted to J1 in 2009, he did not become a regular player. In 2010, he moved to the J2 club Ehime FC and played as a regular player. In 2011, he moved to the J1 club Avispa Fukuoka. Although he played often, the club was relegated to J2 in 2012. In 2013, he moved to the J2 club Ehime FC again. He retired at the end of the 2013 season.

Club statistics

References

External links

1982 births
Living people
Association football people from Kanagawa Prefecture
Japanese footballers
J1 League players
J2 League players
Yokohama F. Marinos players
Vegalta Sendai players
Montedio Yamagata players
Ehime FC players
Avispa Fukuoka players
Association football defenders